The 1977 Minnesota Golden Gophers football team represented the University of Minnesota in the 1977 Big Ten Conference football season. In their sixth year under head coach Cal Stoll, the Golden Gophers compiled a 7–5 record but were outscored by their opponents by a combined total of 180 to 171. 
 
Steve Midboe received the team's Most Valuable Player award. Kicker Paul Rogind and defensive tackle Steve Midboe were named All-Big Ten first team.  Defensive tackle Mark Merrill, center Mark Slater and defensive back Bobby Weber were named All-Big Ten second team. Offensive lineman Dennis Fitzpatrick, offensive lineman Bryson Hollimon, defensive lineman Stan Sytsma and corner back Bob Weber were named Academic All-Big Ten.

Total attendance for the season was 247,118, which averaged to 35,302. The season high for attendance was against rival Michigan.

Schedule

Roster

Game summaries

Michigan

References

Minnesota
Minnesota Golden Gophers football seasons
Minnesota Golden Gophers football